Montravius Adams (born July 24, 1995) is an American football nose tackle for the Pittsburgh Steelers of the National Football League (NFL). He played college football at Auburn.

Early years
Adams attended Dooly County High School in Vienna, Georgia. As a senior, he recorded 127 tackles, 34 tackles for loss and 7.5 sacks, leading the Bobcats to an 11–3 record and an appearance in the Class A state title game. In addition to being named All-State for the second straight year, he was selected as a participant in the 2013 Under Armour All-America Game.

He was rated by Rivals.com as a five-star recruit and the 3rd best defensive lineman in his class. Early on, he leaned towards signing with Clemson (the first school to make an offer), but on National Signing Day in February 2013, Adams committed to play college football for Auburn University.

College career
Adams played in 13 games as a true freshman at Auburn in 2013 and had 20 tackles. In his first career snap, in the season opener against Washington State on August 31, he sacked Cougars quarterback Connor Halliday. At the conclusion of the season, he was named a Freshman All-American by 247 Sports. As a sophomore in 2014, he played in 13 games and made 10 starts, recording 43 tackles, 8 tackles for loss, 3 sacks and an interception. As a junior in 2015, Adams became a permanent starter at nose tackle, and had 44 tackles, 3 tackles for loss, 2.5 sacks and 2 forced fumbles. As a senior, he recorded 44 tackles, 8.5 tackles for loss, 4.5 sacks, 1 forced fumble, 1 interception, 2 blocked kicks, and a touchdown as team captain. SECCounty.com called him "the most consistent force for [an] Auburn defense that went from punchline to power in 2016." He was subsequently named first-team All-SEC, and a second-team All-American (by AP, CBS Sports and AFCA) at the conclusion of the season.

Adams participated in the 2016 Senior Bowl, recording six tackles, one tackle for loss and a fumble recovery.

Professional career

Green Bay Packers
Adams was drafted by the Green Bay Packers in the third round, 93rd overall, in the 2017 NFL Draft. He signed his rookie contract on July 5, 2017. He underwent foot surgery in August after suffering a stress fracture on the second day of training camp and missed the entire preseason as a result. On November 11, 2018, Adams recorded his first career sack on Miami Dolphins quarterback Brock Osweiler in a 31–12 victory. He was placed on injured reserve on November 25, 2020.

New England Patriots
On March 19, 2021, Adams signed with the New England Patriots. On August 31, 2021, the Patriots released Adams.

New Orleans Saints
On September 6, 2021, Adams signed with the New Orleans Saints. He was released on November 16 and re-signed to the practice squad.

Pittsburgh Steelers
On November 30, Adams was signed by the Pittsburgh Steelers off the Saints practice squad.

On March 22, 2022, Adams signed a two-year contract extension with the Steelers.

NFL career statistics

Personal life
Adams has two sons.

References

External links

Auburn Tigers bio

Living people
1995 births
21st-century African-American sportspeople
People from Americus, Georgia
People from Vienna, Georgia
African-American players of American football
Players of American football from Georgia (U.S. state)
American football defensive tackles
Auburn Tigers football players
Green Bay Packers players
New England Patriots players
New Orleans Saints players
Pittsburgh Steelers players